Sookmyung Girls' High School is a private girls high school located in Gangnam-gu, Seoul, South Korea.

History
Sookmyung Girls' High School was founded on May 22, 1906 under the name Myeongsin Girls' School (hangul: 명신여학교; hanja: 明新女學校), and was originally located in Yongdonggung palace. It was then renamed to Sookmyung Girls' High School in May 1909. The official symbols of the School are Magnolia and The Lily of the Valley. Also, the official color is Purple.

The current principal, Heo Young Sook, was appointed in March 2015 as the 13th principal.

See also
Sookmyung Women's University

References

External links
Sookmyung Girl's High School Homepage - Korean language version only.

Education in Seoul
High schools in South Korea
Girls' schools in South Korea
Educational institutions established in 1905
Gangnam District
1905 establishments in Korea